Historias de Nadie is the 2004 album by the Costa Rican group Malpaís.

Track listing
"La Vieja"
"Marina"
"Mazurca de Dámaso"
"El perro azul de la nostalgia"
"Es tan tarde ya"
"Lo que tengo y no"
"El Portoncito"
"Antes del adiós"
"Chao Luna"
"Historia de Nadie"
"Unica"
"Presagio"
"Más al norte del recuerdo"

References

Malpaís (group) albums
Spanish-language albums
2004 albums